The set cover problem is a classical question in combinatorics, computer science, operations research, and complexity theory. It is one of Karp's 21 NP-complete problems shown to be NP-complete in 1972. 

Given a set of elements  (called the universe) and a collection  of  sets whose union equals the universe, the set cover problem is to identify the smallest sub-collection of  whose union equals the universe. However, we can cover all of the elements with the following, smaller number of sets: 

In the set covering decision problem, the input is a pair  and an integer ; the question is whether there is a set covering of size  or less. In the set covering optimization problem, the input is a pair , and the task is to find a set covering that uses the fewest sets.

The decision version of set covering is NP-complete, and the optimization/search version of set cover is NP-hard. It is a problem "whose study has led to the development of fundamental techniques for the entire field" of approximation algorithms. If each set is assigned a cost, it becomes a weighted set cover problem.

Integer linear program formulation
The minimum set cover problem can be formulated as the following integer linear program (ILP).

This ILP belongs to the more general class of ILPs for covering problems.
The integrality gap of this ILP is at most , so its relaxation gives a factor- approximation algorithm for the minimum set cover problem (where  is the size of the universe).

In weighted set cover, the sets are assigned weights.

Hitting set formulation 
Set covering is equivalent to the hitting set problem. That is seen by observing that an instance of set covering can
be viewed as an arbitrary bipartite graph, with the universe represented by vertices on the left, the sets represented by vertices on the
right, and edges representing the inclusion of elements in sets. The task is then to find a minimum cardinality subset of right-vertices which covers all of the left-vertices, which is precisely the Hitting set problem.

Greedy algorithm 

There is a greedy algorithm for polynomial time approximation of set covering that chooses sets according to one rule: at each stage, choose the set that contains the largest number of uncovered elements. This method can be implemented in time linear in the sum of sizes of the input sets, using a bucket queue to prioritize the sets. In other words, it finds a covering that may be  times as large as the minimum one, where  is the -th harmonic number:

For dense instances, however, there exists a -approximation algorithm for every .

The universe consists of  elements. The set system consists of  pairwise disjoint sets 
 with sizes  respectively, as well as two additional disjoint sets ,
each of which contains half of the elements from each . On this input, the greedy algorithm takes the sets

Inapproximability results show that the greedy algorithm is essentially the best-possible polynomial time approximation algorithm for set cover up to lower order terms
(see Inapproximability results below), under plausible complexity assumptions. A tighter analysis for the greedy algorithm shows that the approximation ratio is exactly .

Low-frequency systems 

If each element occurs in at most  sets, then a solution can be found in polynomial time that approximates the optimum to within a factor of  using LP relaxation.

The algorithm can be described as follows:
 Find an optimal solution  for the program  using some polynomial-time method of solving linear programs.
 Pick all sets  for which the corresponding variable  has value at least 1/ in the solution .

Inapproximability results 

Feige (1998) improved this lower bound to  under the same assumptions, which essentially matches the approximation ratio achieved by the greedy algorithm.  established a lower bound

Weighted set cover 

Relaxing the integer linear program for weighted set cover stated above, one may use randomized rounding to get an -factor approximation. Non weighted set cover can be adapted to the weighted case.

Related problems 
 Hitting set is an equivalent reformulation of Set Cover.
 Vertex cover is a special case of Hitting Set.
 Edge cover is a special case of Set Cover.
 Set packing
 Maximum coverage problem is to choose at most k sets to cover as many elements as possible.
 Dominating set is the problem of selecting a set of vertices (the dominating set) in a graph such that all other vertices are adjacent to at least one vertex in the dominating set. The Dominating set problem was shown to be NP complete through a reduction from Set cover.
 Exact cover problem is to choose a set cover with no element included in more than one covering set.
 Red Blue Set Cover.
Set-cover abduction.

Notes

References 

 .
 
 .
 
 .
 .
 .

External links 

 Benchmarks with Hidden Optimum Solutions for Set Covering, Set Packing and Winner Determination
 A compendium of NP optimization problems - Minimum Set Cover

Families of sets
NP-complete problems
Linear programming
Approximation algorithms
Covering problems